According to the 1935 Polish Constitution, the country was divided into 104 electoral districts, and the Sejm consisted of 208 members. The districts were described in a July 8, 1935, edition of the Journal of Laws of the Republic of Poland, and were:

 District 1 – Warsaw
City of Warsaw Police districts I, II, XII, XXVI,
 District 2 – Warsaw
City of Warsaw Police districts III, IV, V,
 District 3 – Warsaw
City of Warsaw Police districts VI, VII, XIX, XXII,
 District 4 – Warsaw
City of Warsaw Police districts VIII, XI, XVI, XXIII,
 District 5 – Warsaw
City of Warsaw Police districts IX, X, XIII, XX, XXI
 District 6 – Warsaw
Warsaw borough of Praga,
 District 7 – Warsaw
County of Warsaw – Land,
 District 8 – Pułtusk
Counties of Pułtusk, Radzymin County, and Mińsk Mazowiecki County,
 District 9 – Mława
Counties of Mława, Ciechanów County, Przasnysz County, and Maków Mazowiecki County,
 District 10 – Sierpc
Counties of Sierpc, Rypin County, and Lipno,
 District 11 – Włocławek
Counties of Włocławek, Nieszawa County, and Kutno County,
 District 12 – Płock
Counties of Płock, Płońsk County, and Gostynin County,
 District 13 – Łowicz
Counties of Łowicz, Sochaczew County, and Błonie County
 District 14 – Skierniewice
Counties of Skierniewice, Grójec, and Rawa Mazowiecka County
 District 15 – Łódź
City of Łódź  Police districts II, III, V,
 District 16 – Łódź 
City of Łódź  Police districts I, IV, VI, VII, X,
 District 17 – Łódź 
City of Łódź  Police districts VIII, IX, XI, XII, XIII, XIV,
 District 18 – Łódź 
Counties of Łódź  – Land, and Łęczyca County,
 District 19 – Koło
Counties of Koło and Konin County,
 District 20 – Kalisz 
Counties of Kalisz and Turek County,
 District 21 – Sieradz
Counties of Sieradz and Łask County,
 District 22 – Piotrków Trybunalski
Counties of Piotrków and Brzeziny County,
 District 23 – Radomsko
Counties of Radomsko and Wieluń County,
 District 24 – Kielce
Counties of Kielce and Włoszczowa County,
 District 25 – Częstochowa
Counties of Częstochowa – City, and Częstochowa – Land,
 District 26 – Zawiercie
Counties of Zawiercie and Olkusz County,
 District 27 – Sosnowiec
Counties of Sosnowiec – City and Będzin County,
 District 28 – Jędrzejów
Counties of Jędrzejów, Miechów County, and Pińczów County,
 District 29 – Sandomierz
Counties of Sandomierz and Stopnica County,
 District 30 – Opatów
Counties of Opatów and Iłża County,
 District 31 – Końskie
Counties of Końskie and Opoczno County,
 District 32 – Radom
Counties of Radom – City, Radom – Land, and Kozienice County,
 District 33 – Lublin
Counties of Lublin – City, and Lublin – Land,
 District 34 – Puławy
Counties of Puławy and Janów Lubelski County,
 District 35 – Zamość
Counties of Zamość, Biłgoraj County, and Tomaszów Lubelski County,
 District 36 – Chełm
Counties of Chełm, Krasnystaw County, and Hrubieszów County,
 District 37 – Biała Podlaska
Counties of Biała Podlaska, Radzyń, and Włodawa County,
 District 38 – Łuków
Counties of Łuków, Garwolin, and Lubartów,
 District 39 – Siedlce
Counties of Siedlce, Sokołów and Węgrów,
 District 40 – Białystok
Counties of Białystok – City, Białystok – Land, and Szczuczyn,
 District 41 – Ostrów Mazowiecka
Counties of Ostrów Mazowiecka, Wysokie Mazowieckie County, and Bielsk Podlaski County,
 District 42 – Łomża
Counties of Łomża and Ostrołęka County,
 District 43 – Suwałki
Counties of Suwałki, Augustów County, and Sokółka County,
 District 44 – Grodno
Counties of Grodno, and Wolkowysk County,
 District 45 – Wilno
City of Wilno Police districts I, II, VI, and the town of Nowa Wilejka,
 District 46 – Wilno
City of Wilno Police districts III, IV, and V,
 District 47 – Wilno
Counties of Wilno – Troki County (without the town of Nowa Wilejka), and Święciany County,
 District 48 – Glebokie
Counties of Dzisna County, Braslaw County, and Postawy County,
 District 49 – Oszmiana
Counties of Oszmiana, Wilejka County, and Molodeczno County, 
 District 50 – Lida
Counties of Lida, and Wolozyn County,
 District 51 – Nowogródek
Counties of Nowogródek, Szczuczyn County, and Slonim County,
 District 52 – Baranowicze
Counties of Baranowicze, Nieswiez, and Stolpce,
 District 53 – Brzesc nad Bugiem
Counties of Brzesc, and Pruzana County,
 District 54 – Kobryn
Counties of Kobryn, Drohiczyn County, Kosow Poleski County, and Kamien Koszyrski County,
 District 55 – Pinsk
Counties of Pinsk, Luniniec County, and Stolin County,
 District 56 – Luck
Counties of Luck, and Horochow County,
 District 57 – Kowel
Counties of Kowel, Luboml County, and Wlodzimierz Wolynski County,
 District 58 – Sarny
Counties of Sarny, and Kostopol County,
 District 59 – Rowne
Counties of Rowne, and Zdołbunów County,
 District 60 – Krzemieniec
Counties of Krzemieniec, and Dubno County,
 District 61 – Tarnopol
Counties of Tarnopol, Zbaraz County, and Skalat County,
 District 62 – Złoczów
Counties of Złoczów, Kamionka Strumilowa County, Radziechów County, and Brody County,
 District 63 – Brzeżany
Counties of Brzeżany, Przemyslany County, and Zborow County,
 District 64 – Buczacz
Counties of Buczacz, Trembowla County, and Podhajce County,
 District 65 – Czortków
Counties of Czortków, Kopczynce County, Borszczow County, and Zaleszczyki County,
 District 66 – Stanisławów
Counties of Stanisławów, Tlumacz County, and Nadworna County,
 District 67 – Kolomyja
Counties of Kolomyja, Horodenka County, Sniatyn County, and Kosow County,
 District 68 – Kalusz
Counties of Kalusz, Rohatyn County, and Dolina County,
 District 69 – Stryj
Counties of Stryj, Zydaczow County, and Bobrka County,
 District 70 – Lwów
City of Lwów Police districts II, III, V, VIII, IX
 District 71 – Lwów
City of Lwów Police districts I, IV, VI, VII, X
 District 72 – Lwów
Counties of Lwów – Land, Grodek Jagiellonski County, and Mosciska County,
 District 73 – Sokal
Counties of Sokal, Zolkiew County, Rawa Ruska County, and Lubaczów County,
 District 74 – Przemyśl
Counties of Przemyśl, Jarosław County, and Jaworów County,
 District 75 – Drohobycz
Counties of Drohobycz, and Rudki County,
 District 76 – Sambor
Counties of Sambor, Dobromil County, and Turka County,
 District 77 – Sanok
Counties of Sanok, Lesko County, and Krosno County,
 District 78 – Rzeszów
Counties of Rzeszów, Brzozów County, and Kolbuszowa County,
 District 79 – Łańcut
Counties of Łańcut, Przeworsk County, Nisko County, and Tarnobrzeg County,
 District 80 – Kraków
City of Kraków Police districts I, II, III, 
 District 81 – Kraków
City of Kraków Police districts IV, V, VI, 
 District 82 – Kraków
Counties of Kraków – Land, and Chrzanów County,
 District 83 – Bochnia
Counties of Bochnia, Limanowa County, and Brzesko County,
 District 84 – Tarnów
Counties of Tarnów, Dąbrowa Tarnowska County, and Mielec County,
 District 85 – Jasło
Counties of Jasło, Dębica County, and Gorlice County,
 District 86 – Nowy Sącz
Counties of Nowy Sącz, and Nowy Targ County,
 District 87 – Wadowice
Counties of Wadowice, Żywiec County, and Myślenice County,
 District 88 – Katowice
County of Katowice – City, and the city of Chorzów,
 District 89 – Katowice
County of Katowice – Land,
 District 90 – Świętochłowice
Counties of Świętochłowice, Tarnowskie Góry County, and Lubliniec County,
 District 91 – Rybnik
Counties of Rybnik, and Pszczyna County,
 District 92 – Bielsko-Biała
Counties of Bielsko-Biała – City, Bielsko-Biała – Land, and Cieszyn County,
 District 93 – Poznań
City of Poznań Police districts I, III, IV, V,
 District 94 – Poznań
City of Poznań Police districts II, VI, VII, VIII,
 District 95 – Poznań
Counties of Poznań – Land, Oborniki County, Czarnków County, Międzychód County, Szamotuły County, and Nowy Tomyśl County,
 District 96 – Leszno
Counties of Leszno, Wolsztyn County, Kościan County, Śrem County, Gostyń County, and Rawicz County,
 District 97 – Ostrów Wielkopolski
Counties of Ostrów Wielkopolski, Kępno County, Krotoszyn County, and Jarocin County,
 District 98 – Gniezno
Counties of Gniezno – City, Gniezno – Land, Środa Wielkopolska County, Września County, and Wągrowiec County,
 District 99 – Inowrocław
Counties of Inowrocław – City, Inowrocław – Land, Mogilno County, Żnin County, and Szubin County,
 District 100 – Bydgoszcz
Counties of Bydgoszcz – City, Bydgoszcz – Land, Wyrzysk County, and Chodzież County,
 District 101 – Toruń
Counties of Toruń – City, Toruń – Land, Chełmno County, and Wąbrzeźno County,
 District 102 – Grudziądz
Counties of Grudziądz – City, Grudziądz – Land, Brodnica County, Lubawa County, and Działdowo County,
 District 103 – Chojnice
Counties of Chojnice, Sępólno Krajenskie County, Tuchola County, Świecie County, Starogard Gdański County, and Tczew County,
 District 104 – Gdynia
Counties of Gdynia – City, Wejherowo County, Kartuzy County, and Kościerzyna County.

Sources 
 Journal of Laws of the Republic of Poland, July 1935, PDF format

1935 in law
1935 in Poland
Second Polish Republic